Hannah Reynolds may refer to:
 Hannah Reynolds (soccer)
 Hannah Reynolds (EastEnders)